The Aero Nord AIR series is a family of French paramotors that was designed and produced by Aero Nord of Lorgies, and later Bénifontaine, for powered paragliding. Now out of production, when it was available the aircraft was supplied as a complete and ready-to-fly.

Design and development
The aircraft was designed to comply with the US FAR 103 Ultralight Vehicles rules as well as European regulations. It features a paraglider-style wing, single-place accommodation and a single  RDM engine in pusher configuration with a 4:1 ratio reduction drive and a  diameter two-bladed wooden propeller. As is the case with all paramotors, take-off and landing is accomplished by foot.

The aircraft is built with a welded aluminium tubing propeller cage, which can be broken down into two or four sections for ground stowage. Inflight steering is accomplished via handles that actuate the canopy brakes, creating roll and yaw.

Operational history
Reviewer Rene Coulon wrote in 2003 that the "machine shows good understanding of the market and skill in the production" and noted that the series has attracted "considerable attention".

Variants
AIR 1
AIR 2
AIR 3

Specifications (AIR 1)

References

AIM
2000s French ultralight aircraft
Single-engined pusher aircraft
Paramotors